William E. Smith (1865 – August 9, 1886) was a Major League Baseball player, who appeared in one game for the 1884 Cleveland Blues of the National League as their left fielder.  Smith died in Toronto, Ontario, Canada at the age of 21 in a diving accident that broke his back.

References

External links

Cleveland Blues (NL) players
1865 births
1886 deaths
Baseball players from Ohio
Major League Baseball left fielders
19th-century baseball players
Diving deaths